Magnús Helgi Magnússon (30 September 1922 – 22 August 2006) was an Icelandic politician and former minister for social affairs from September 1978 to February 1980.

External links 

 Non auto-biography of Magnús Helgi Magnússon on the parliament website

1922 births
2006 deaths
Social Affairs ministers of Iceland
Magnus Helgi Magnusson